Olenecamptus shanensis is a species of beetle in the family Cerambycidae. It was described by Gilmour in 1952.

References

Dorcaschematini
Beetles described in 1952